Flywheel is a 2003 American Christian drama film about the unexpected pitfalls that a used car dealer experienced as he suddenly goes honest.  The dealer intentionally overcharges his customers until reaching a turning point in his life where he decides to end his shady business practices and become a Christian.  Alex Kendrick both directed the film and starred in the lead role, and with his brother, Stephen Kendrick, co-wrote the film.  Flywheel also features Lisa Arnold and Tracy Goode.

First released on April 9, 2003, this movie is the first full-length feature film by Sherwood Pictures, which now includes the production of Facing the Giants, Fireproof, Courageous, War Room, Overcomer, Show Me the Father, Courageous Legacy, and Lifemark.

Plot 

Jay Austin (Alex Kendrick) is a car salesman who consistently cheats his customers, even to the point of overcharging his own pastor.  He teaches his rotund salesmen, Bernie Meyers (Tracy Goode) and Vince Berkeley (Treavor Lokey), to do likewise.  Jay occasionally attends church, but only because his wife Judy (Janet Lee Dapper) wants him to go.  He also fakes giving a donation to the church.  His relationships with his wife and son (Richie Hunnewell), who both disapprove of his dishonesty, deteriorate.  In addition he is facing foreclosure on his lot by the bank.  Jay becomes troubled in his conscience, and one day while flipping television channels, he sees a pastor preaching that "you're in the shape you're in today because of the choices you've made."  Jay becomes personally convicted and becomes a born-again Christian, prompting him to change his business practices.

Jay apologizes to his pregnant wife and his son and decides to sell cars honestly from that point on.  However, he is now thousands of dollars in debt and facing the loss of his dealership if he can't catch up on his payments to the bank.  Jay decides not to worry about his situation and to "let God handle it," telling the Lord that it is His lot.  After the two rotund salesmen, whose interactions often provide comedy, leave over a disagreement about the newly reformed business practices, a young, innocent-looking "newcomer" Kevin Cantrell (Daniel Titus) comes to Jay to work for six weeks and asks him questions, such as how he sells cars. Jay answers by saying, "Just sell the car to them by its real price and God will decide." Sales are honest, but the amounts are mediocre at best.  Kevin leaves after the six weeks, but later Jay sees himself on television as part of a news investigation on car dealerships.  Kevin was a carefully concealed undercover agent investigating which car dealers cheat, and the report says that Jay Austin Motors was the only honest dealership among them.  The next day Jay comes to the lot and sees many people there to buy his cars.  Jay even has to call his wife to help sell all the cars on the lot that day.  The total of the sales above the cost of the cars is enough to cover the demands of the banker, who comes later that day and wonders where all the cars have gone.

Business continues to be brisk, and then Jay begins to feel convicted in his conscience about his dishonesty during the prior two years that he had been in business, and with his wife's encouragement decides to make restitution to all the customers he had overcharged.  He also finds that the amount due them was the same as the profit he had after all the bills and salaries.

Shortly thereafter, Jay is asked to do another live television interview, this time with reporter Hillary Vale (Lisa Arnold) of WALB-TV.  On camera, Jay sees his now former employee Bernie saying that Jay Austin is a cheater, leading Hillary to say that the viewers "will just have to decide for themselves".  However, many of his old customers (presumably all seeing the news) to whom Jay had just made restitution wasted no time to visit the lot to tell Hillary that there is more to the story.  Hillary broadcasts an update 30 minutes after the prior live newscast to reflect the lot's new visitations.

At home Jay's wife and son, who had been praying for Jay since the first report, also see this latest development on television, and then his wife starts to feel contractions.  Jay exits the lot and rushes home to bring his wife to the hospital.  She gives birth to a girl named Faith, to stand as a living reminder of Jay's newfound faith in God.  At the end of the film, Jay drives away with his son in his 1958 Triumph TR3, an acquisition at the beginning of the film, which Max (Walter Burnett), his mechanic, had repaired with a newly installed flywheel (thus the film's title).

Cast 

Alex Kendrick as Jay Austin
Janet Lee Dapper as Judy Austin
Roger Breland as Mr. Austin
Richie Hunnewell as Todd Austin
Lisa Arnold as Hillary Vale
Walter Burnett as Max Kendall
Tracy Goode as Bernie Meyers
Rutha Harris as Katie Harris
Treavor Lokey as Vince Berkeley
Steve Moore as Dan Michaels
Marc Keenan as Sam Jones
Daniel Titus as Kevin Cantrell
Mac George as George MacDonald

Background 
Filming of Flywheel began in November 2002 and continued into 2003 by the Sherwood Baptist Church team.  The film was shot digitally to avoid film processing expenses. The filmmakers set a budget of $20,000 for production costs, and used church members as the cast and production crew. Stephen Kendrick said, "We produced Flywheel with one Canon XL1s camera, G4 Mac computers and some Final Cut Pro editing software."  It was released to theaters on April 9, 2003, first to a Carmike Theatre in Albany, Georgia, and a director's cut DVD was released on November 13, 2007.

Release 
Flywheel was released through Carmike Cinemas in Tifton and Columbus, Georgia. The film ultimately grossed $37,000 theatrically. It was novelized by suspense writer Eric Wilson, titled Flywheel and published by Thomas Nelson, in 2008.

DVD release 
Flywheel: Director's Cut was released to DVD on November 13, 2007.  DVD sales of the film were more successful, with more than 300,000 copies sold. The director's cut included an eight-part Bible study as one of its special features. Stephen Kendrick said, "They are color correcting [the Director's Cut of] Flywheel. They are adding better sound effects and some things like that. Adding a director's commentary. It will be a director's cut version. A new cover on it, adding a couple of extra languages." Six minutes of the film were removed, making the running time 114 minutes.

Reception

Rotten Tomatoes reports that 82% of audiences liked the film.
Flywheel won awards at the 2004 WYSIWYG Film Festival, 2004 ICVM Crown Awards and 2004 Sabaoth International Film Festival.

Awards 

2004 WYSIWYG Film Festival
Best Feature Film
2004 ICVM Crown Awards
Best Evangelistic Film
Best Screenplay
Best Drama under $250,000
2004 Sabaoth International Film Festival
Best Screenplay
Best Production
Parable Award

References

External links
 
 
 

2003 films
2003 independent films
American independent films
Films about evangelicalism
Films directed by Alex Kendrick
Films about religion
Films shot in Georgia (U.S. state)
Sherwood Pictures films
Films set in 2003
Films about car dealerships
2003 directorial debut films
2000s English-language films
2000s American films